The National Defence University (NDU), formerly introduced as Army War Course (1963–70), the National Defence College (1970–2007), is the military university with additional status of public university of the Islamic Republic of Pakistan focused on military education and training for the armed forces, including Pakistan military forces and two hundred foreign participants. Formerly established on 28 May 1970 at Rawalpindi, its academic principles are focused on command instructions, national security, military strategy, and war studies among other specified academic disciplines. It is one of the oldest military education and training institutes in the country with additional enrollments reserved for the civil servants.

Major general, then general Abdul Hamid Khan served its first commandant, while brigadier Muhammad Ahmed was appointed the first chief instructor. The president of the Islamic Republic of Pakistan is appointed its chancellor while the chief of staff recommends appointment and the removal of its president, usually a three star armed officer. Nearly 44 years later of its establishment as Armed War Course, it was awarded the status of university after being recognised by the education commission of Pakistan on 5 February 2007 while the former Armed War Course (later re-designated as Armed War Forces Course) became one of its components.

History 
The origin of the National Defence University is historically associated with major general, the then lieutenant general, Sahabzada Yaqub Khan and Command and Staff College who introduced Army War Course on 1 May 1963 to Command and Staff College after he was asked in 1962 to establish a separate and a single purpose war course to that college. It initially comprised twelve participants (known as students and faculty members), including two from armed forces  one from navy and other from air force. With the continuation of war studies, its participants were increased to sixteen in 1965. However, staff college was left without war course faculty following the 1965 conflict between India and Pakistan. The discontinuation of the faculty gained attention of the authorities, and the National Defence College (NDC), a stand-alone institute was established on 28 May 1970 at Lalkurti area of Rawalpindi Cantonment. It was housed in the Ayub Hall of the old National Assembly Building. The institute was later shifted to its permanent building where it worked for nearly 25 years.

During that 25 years, the college was re-designated multiple times, including in 1971 when the Army War Course was awarded the status of the Armed Forces War Course to serve for armed forces than only army. The number of faculty participants were increased from sixteen to twenty, with three officers from navy and air force.

To award the officers MSc degree in war studies, the prime minister, Zulfiqar Ali Bhutto signed an order in 1975 to affiliate the NDC with Federal University of Islamabad (in modern-day Quaid-i-Azam University). Five years later of affiliation with Quaid university, military dictator Muhammad Zia-ul-Haq, the then 6th president of Pakistan signed an order in February 1980 to shift the college to the capital city Islamabad for its space expansion. Following that order, it was shifted to the new building on 17 August 1995.

The government of Pakistan upgraded it to university in 2007, while the Naval War College gained the status of Armed Forces War College, which is now a component of the National Defence University. As of March 2007, the NDU acts as a nation university in the country, and the two years later of its upgradation, Joint Chiefs of Staff Committee redesignated both Army War Course, Armed Forces War Course, and National Defence Course faculties into one single component of the university, which is now known as National Security and War Course.

Buildings and sites 

Since its formation as a faculty and then college in Rawalpindi, it was shifted several times from one building to other, including the old national assembly near Rawalpindi Cantonment until it was permanently shifted to Islamabad in 1995. The main building is now located in Sector E-9, Islamabad near Margalla Hills.

Emblem 
The emblem (generally identified as logo, although the official description of emblem do not mention "logo") of the NDU depicts the concept of national security, defence and ideological foundation of the organisation, consisting an Islamic shield with three-service colors, encircled by a black border with silver edges. It is surrounded by a golden wreath with a star and crescent presented on the top of emblem. It is placed on a green background, depicting the national color of Pakistan. The lower portion of the Islamic shield is occupied by the two swords placed in the form of crossed sword and a pen, which occupies the upper portion. The pen and crossed sword and their placements represent "honour, strength and achievement through learning".

The motto is inscribed inside the shield which is placed on top centre printed in gold letters.

Composition 

The National Defence University consists two heads  the president of Pakistan who acts as chancellor and a three star military officers, usually a lieutenant general or a vice admiral who acts a president of the university, sometimes referred to as commandant university. The organisation consist four main faculties/branches such as Faculty of Security Studies (FSS), Faculty of Contemporary Studies (FCS), Institute for Strategic Studies, Research & Analysis (ISSRA), and National War Gaming Center (NWGC). The academic administration of FSS and FCS are headed by a dean.

Faculty of Security Studies 
The National Security College, Armed Forces War College, and Allied Officers Division (AOD) are headed by two star officer that works under FSS faculty. Its academic discipline is focused on national security and its elements, in addition to military, operational, and nuclear strategies. It also involves in preparedness of command and staff assignments.

Faculty of Contemporary Studies 
The FCS awards academic degrees to the participants. It includes five departments such as Leadership and Management Studies (LMS)  which awards bachelor's degree, master of philosophy, master's in project management, and doctor of philosophy. The Government and Public Policy (GPP) awards same degrees as to LMS, however, it is focused on government and public policy and also excludes master's in project management. The Strategic Studies (SS), International Relations (IR), and Peace and Conflict Studies (PCS) award the officers same degrees as to GPP, however their branches of studies varied.

Institute for Strategic Studies, Research & Analysis 
The ISSRA organization is headed by a two star officer who acts a director general. It is further divided into seven branches such as Global and Regional Studies, Internal Studies, Defence Studies, Coord & Collaboration, Research & Publication, Keystone Capstone & Pinnacle Program, and Sahabzada Yaqub Khan (SYK) library. At staff, ISSRA is primarily focused on seminars, discussions, conferences, visiting briefings, and to interact with think tanks within the country.

National War Gaming Center 
The National War Gaming Center (NWGC) do not have other branches likewise FCC or FCS. Based on strategic thinking, it was created to run wargames focused on to execute military operation plans, disaster, and emergency management. It uses the NATO-based computer network to execute military tactics.

Libraries 
Its digital library consists print material from 70,000 books, periodicals, contemporary journals, pamphlets, government and daily newspaper publications. One of its major print material resources is Higher Education Commission of the country. It has also a fictional library which consists data from books, concerning women and children.

Its mapping section is intended for the creation of maps, and draughtsmen or other persons specialized in that area participates in that section designed for the production of graphic works.

Academic profile

Teaching and degrees 
The National Defence University's contemporary studies faculty award bachelor's, master of philosophy and doctorate degrees in various academic fields such as international relations, and public policy among others.

Faculty of Contemporary Studies
Leadership and Management Studies (LMS)
BS
M.Phil
MS-PM
Ph.D
Government and Public Policy (GPP)
BS
M.Phill
Ph.D
Strategic Studies (SS)
BS
M.Phill
Ph.D
International Relations (IR)
BS
M.Phill
Ph.D
Peace and Conflict Studies (PCS)
BS
M.Phill
Ph.D

Role as a think tank 
The NDU's wing Institute for Strategic Studies, Research & Analysis (ISSRA) acts as a national think tank on national security matters, and is reportedly an internal part of the National Security Division, headed by a national security division secretary. Inputs are provided to the government and armed forces to maintains academic links with domestic and foreign think tanks and defence universities with which Pakistan shares friendly relations.

Amendments 
The parliament of Pakistan introduced an act in 2011 titled National Defence University, Act 2011, outlining the academic, administration, and financial amendments, in addition to establishment of the NDU. It was formerly signed by the president on 14 May 2011 after majlis-ash-shura such as the national assembly and the senate passed the bill. It functions under that act, however employing officers, teacher and other staff members are sanctioned by the Higher Education Commission Ordinance, 2002. The act restrict government and other authorities to qualify or disqualify the officers, teachers, students, or any other participant associated with the university, on the grounds of their "gender, religion, race, creed, class, colour, or domicile".

The act identifies the chancellor, president, dean, commandant (director general), chairperson (chief instructor), registrar, controller examination, director administration and director finance as the principal officers and also determines their powers and the functions.

Appointments 
The act allows the president of Pakistan to act as the chancellor, while the president of the university is recommended by the chief of army staff for the final approval of the chancellor. If the post of university president falls vacant due to any uncertainty such as health complications or death, it is not assumed by the other members with an additional charge of the president. The post is generally assumed for the term of five years, however the incumbent may be terminated if recommended by the army chief.

List of presidents/commandants

Notable alumni 

Throughout its history from a college to university, some of its alumni and faculty members became notable in academic, politics, military and many other varied fields.

Many Pakistani generals, including Ashfaq Parvez Kayani, Ehsan ul Haq, and Raheel Sharif attended the National Defence University. Kayani graduated from National Defence College and also remained faculty member of the university. Ehsan ul Haq graduated from NDU and Command and Staff College, Quetta, an affiliated institute of the university. Raheel Sharif is among the other generals who attended the university.

In addition to Pakistani generals, some alumni from the naval department became notable in their respective fields. Admiral Afzal Tahir graduated from the National Defence College, while Shahid Karimullah, attended armed forces war course department of the National Defence College. Zafar Mahmood Abbasi is also an alumnus of the university while Amjad Khan Niazi graduated from NDU and Command and Staff College.

Musharraf, the 10th president of Pakistan graduated from the National Defence College and Command and Staff College, Quetta, an affiliated institute of NDU.

Publications 
NDU Journal is an annual feature of the university which is based on the research papers by the students, researchers, and policy makers. The publications provide ideas on issues of national security of Pakistan. Before an article is published in the journal, it is single peer reviewed.
Margalla Papers is biannual publication, concerning contemporary global politics, globalization, foreign policy, strategic alliance, economic partnerships, and regional organization. It also involves the role of United Nations peacekeeping, law of nations and global commons.
ISSRA Paper is an annual academic publication of Institute for Strategic Studies, Research and Analysis (ISSRA). It cover the issues relating governance, public policy, in addition to promotion of awareness to that issues. It is contributed by anyone, however articles are single peer-reviewed before they appear in journal.
NDU Monograph is a scholarly journal of ISSRA. It is contributed by the researchers on military issues and collaboration.
AFWC Journal is a journal of Armed Force War Course which publishes the public opinions contributed by the participants.

See also 
Military academies in Pakistan
Pakistan Military Academy
Pakistan Air Force Academy
Air University Pakistan

References

Notes

External links 
National Defence University FAQ at the official website

Educational institutions established in 1970
1970 establishments in Pakistan
National Defence University, Pakistan
Pakistan Army affiliated organizations